Brittain may refer to:

 Brittain (surname)
 Brittain, West Virginia, United States
 Brittain, Ohio, United States
 Brittain Creek, a stream in North Carolina
 Brittain Dining Hall
 Brittain Speaker, a historical name for the Leslie speaker

See also
 Brittian, a township in Hettinger County, North Dakota
 Britain (disambiguation)
 Britten (disambiguation)